The Ecuador snail-eater (Dipsas oreas) is a non-venomous snake found in Ecuador..

References

Dipsas
Snakes of South America
Reptiles of Ecuador
Endemic fauna of Ecuador
Reptiles described in 1868
Taxa named by Edward Drinker Cope